Hubei Sanonda Co., Ltd. is a Chinese pesticide producer, based in Jingzhou, Hubei Province. As at 31 December 2016, state-owned enterprise ChemChina via Sanonda Group (A share) and Adama Agricultural Solutions (B share) owned a combined 30.75% stake. It was followed by the Government of Qichun County (0.70%). A share accounted for 61.27% share capital, comparing to 38.73% for B share (domestically traded share for foreigner in mainland China).

In 2016, a plan to acquire 100% stake of Adama Agricultural Solutions from ChemChina was announced, by issuing new shares to ChemChina and a private equity fund that related to China Cinda. The B share held by ADAMA (which would become treasury stock) would be canceled. After the deal ChemChina would owned over 70% stake. As China Cinda was also owned by the State Council indirectly (via the Ministry of Finance). The total stake held by the Central Government of China was unknown.

History
The predecessor of Hubei Sanonda Co., Ltd. was found in 1958. In 1992 the company was re-incorporated as company limited by shares, under the new Company Law of China as part of marketization (State Council allowed corporation to issue shares since 1986). in 1993 the shares of the company started to float on Shenzhen Stock Exchange. Shashi Government (Shashi later merged to form Jingzhou) was the major shareholder for 52.35% stake. In 1996, Sanonda Group (now known as Sanonda Holdings) was formed as an intermediate holding company for Jingzhou Government for 44.66% stake, with the Government of Qichun County acquired a minority stake from the Government of Jingzhou in 1995.

In 2005 ChemChina became the largest shareholder by acquiring 100% share of Sanonda Group, which owned 20.57% stake of Sanonda at that time.

Adama Agricultural Solutions acquired part of the B share (shares for foreigner which float in mainland China) of Sanonda in 2013 (about 10.6% of total share capital), at that time ChemChina (via wholly owned subsidiary China National Agrochemical Corporation) owned 60% Adama's stake.

References

External links
 

Chemical companies of China
Agriculture companies of China
Companies listed on the Shenzhen Stock Exchange
Government agencies established in 1958
1958 establishments in China
Chinese companies established in 1992
Chemical companies established in 1992
Companies based in Hubei
ChemChina
Companies owned by the provincial government of China
Government-owned companies of China